Henry Yovani Reyes Chigua  is Guatemala's Minister of National Defense.

References

Living people
Year of birth missing (living people)
Defense Ministers of Guatemala